The Sanwa Bank Cup was a football competition unofficial organised by J.League and sponsored by the Sanwa Bank (predecessor of current MUFG Bank). The competition was held between 1994 and 1997 and played two weeks before the opening of J. League (in the case of 1997, one week before the opening match of the J. League Cup). 

The teams invited were the J. League champions of the previous season (in the case of 1997, the winners of Suntory Cup '96 J. League Champions' Finals) and the champions of a major foreign league. All editions were held in Japan National Stadium in Tokyo.

Results 

Notes

Match details

1997

References

External links
 Official website  (archived, 9 Dec 2004)

J.League
International club association football competitions in Asia
Japanese football friendly trophies